A square nut is a four-sided nut. Compared to standard hex nuts, square nuts have a greater surface in contact with the part being fastened, and therefore provide greater resistance to loosening (though also greater resistance to tightening). They are also much less likely to become rounded-off after repeated loosening/tightening cycles. Square nuts are typically mated with square-headed bolts. Square nuts are used along with flat washers to avoid damage from its sharp edges and increase the strength of the fastener. Square nuts can have standard, fine or coarse threading with platings of zinc yellow, plain, zinc clear, tin and cadmium, among others. Most can meet either the ASTM A194, ASTM A563, or ASTM F594 standard.

History 
Early nuts were made of wood and were used with wooden pegs. The square shape made it possible to form a tool to tighten nut in place. Later wooden fasteners were replaced by steel ones, and modern nuts are forged from steel stock bars and used along with steel bolts.

Square steel nuts were common on machinery of the late 19th through mid 20th century. Today hex nuts have displaced them. One reason is that a hex nut offers a new wrenching access at every 60°, whereas a square nut offers one only at every 90°.

Benefits 
Tighten easily by gripping two sides

Work well in tight spaces by using needle nosed pliers

Work well in blind spots using pliers or a wrench

Can be a quick gauge to measure the position of the nut

Application 
Commonly used in furniture as a blind nut, they are also used in rail channels to prevent turning of rail when pressure is applied. They are also used as a perfect foundation in metal channels for hidden fasteners.

References 

Nuts (hardware)